Colonel Peter Beckford (1643–1710) was acting Governor of Jamaica in 1702. He was also a prominent slave owner, plantation owner, and businessman in early British Jamaica. By the time he died, he had accumulated 20 estates, 1,200 slaves and had founded what Noel Deerr described as "perhaps the greatest fortune ever made in planting."

Early life
Peter was the son of another Peter Beckford, of Maidenhead, England. Sir Thomas Beckford, Sheriff of London was his uncle, as was Captain Richard Beckford, who was trading in Jamaica from 1659.

Planter and slave owner
England had invaded the island in 1655 and the Colony of Jamaica proved a lucrative business proposition for Englishmen who wished to create sugar plantations there.

In 1662, Peter Beckford emigrated to the island, taking with him two or three enslaved Africans, and engaged himself as hunter and horse catcher. Having served as a seaman, he was granted a thousand acres (4 km2) of land in Clarendon by royal patent on 6 March 1669.

He took an active part in island politics, representing St. Catherine in the Assembly in 1675, and was later called to the council, where he was appointed President. He was appointed Chief Justice of Jamaica in 1703. He was the first Custos of Kingston, and a street was named after him there. He was renowned for being haughty with a strong temper and was involved in many heated debates.

Family and legacy
Beckford was twice married—first to Bridget, who died in 1691, and then again to Anne Ballard in 1696—and had two sons, the eldest of whom was also called Peter.

When he died suddenly in a fit of passion in 1710, he was the wealthiest planter in Jamaica. Charles Leslie claimed Beckford was "in possession of the largest property real and personal of any subject in Europe." This wealth was reputedly in the form of 20 Jamaican estates, 1500 slaves, and £1,500,000 in bank stock. His death resulted from an accident when he rushed to the defence of his son, who had caused a commotion when the governor, Thomas Handasyd, tried to dissolve the House of Assembly. Swords were drawn, and the elder Beckford allegedly fell down the stairs and died.

Peter junior gave him a grandson, William Beckford, generally known as "Alderman Beckford" and twice Lord Mayor of London. He in turn produced the great grandson, William Thomas Beckford, the writer and art collector. The latter had his great grandfather's portrait on display, according to Henry Venn Lansdown:
"That is the portrait of my great-grandfather, Colonel Peter Beckford. It was painted by a French artist, who went to Jamaica for the purpose, at the time he was Governor of the island. It is a full length portrait, large as life, the Colonel dressed in a scarlet coat embroidered richly with gold."

Petersfield in Westmoreland Parish, Jamaica is named after him.

Notes

1643 births
1710 deaths
Governors of Jamaica
Chief justices of Jamaica
Colony of Jamaica judges
18th-century Jamaican judges
17th-century Jamaican people
Planters of Jamaica
British slave owners